
Year 488 (CDLXXXVIII) was a leap year starting on Friday (link will display the full calendar) of the Julian calendar. At the time, it was known as the Year of the Consulship of Ecclesius and Sividius (or, less frequently, year 1241 Ab urbe condita). The denomination 488 for this year has been used since the early medieval period, when the Anno Domini calendar era became the prevalent method in Europe for naming years.

Events 
 By place 

 Byzantine Empire 
 Emperor Zeno regains power from the usurper Leontius and the Isaurian patrician Illus, who are captured and executed, ending a 4-year rebellion (see 484).
 Zeno orders Theodoric the Great to overthrow his rival Odoacer, who has established himself as king of Italy (see 476). He marches with an Ostrogoth army to the West.

 Europe  
 According to the Anglo-Saxon Chronicle, Hengist dies and is succeeded by his son Oisc as king of Kent.
 The East Roman Emperor Zeno tasks the King of the Ostrogoths, Theoderic the Great, with conducting a campaign against Odoacer, whom he initially had recognised as his representative in Italy.
 Among the peoples who live on the south bank of the Danube in Noricum ripense and who are de facto ruled by the Rugii, whose empire has its centre near Krems on the north bank, are Romii who had been evacuated earlier from Danube settlements above the River Enns. They include members of the Severin convent. Because some of the Rugii want to fight for East Rome against Odoacer, they destroy the Rugian Empire and allow the Romii to be evacuated to Italy by his brother, Hunulf, in order to prevent the re-establishment of the Rugian Empire by a surviving prince. The northern Danubian Limes of the Roman Empire are effectively abandoned. Even the relics of Severinus of Noricum are carried with them.
 The Gepids capture Belgrade.

 Persia 
 Kavadh I is crowned by the nobles, and succeeds his blind uncle Balash as the 19th king of Persia.

 Asia 
 Ninken, adopted heir of Seinei, succeeds his brother Kenzō and becomes new emperor of Japan. 

 By topic 

 Religion 
 Peter the Fuller is succeeded by Palladius as patriarch of Antioch.
 Fravitta becomes patriarch of Constantinople.

Births 
 He Di, emperor of Southern Qi (d. 502)
 Senán mac Geirrcinn, Irish saint
 Yu, empress of Northern Wei (d. 507)

Deaths 
 Balash, king of the Persian Empire
 Hengest, leader of Kent
 Illus, Byzantine general
 Leontius, Byzantine usurper
 Peter the Fuller, patriarch of Antioch

References